Oncidium amictum is a species of orchid endemic to southeastern Brazil.

References

External links 

amictum
Orchids of Brazil